Joe Darion (30 January 1917 — 16 June 2001) was an American musical theatre lyricist, most famous for Man of La Mancha, which is considered, by some critics,  as a precursor to 1980s sung-through musicals such as Les Miserables.

Darion was born in New York City and died in  Lebanon, New Hampshire.

References

External links
 

 Joe Darion Papers, 1954-1969, held by the Billy Rose Theatre Division, New York Public Library of the Performing Arts

American musical theatre lyricists
Broadway composers and lyricists
1917 births
2001 deaths
20th-century American dramatists and playwrights
20th-century American male writers
American male dramatists and playwrights
Writers from New York City
Tony Award winners